William Howard Taft High School is a public high school in the Northside Independent School District (NISD) of San Antonio, Texas, United States. As with all NISD high schools, the school is named for a United States Supreme Court justice, in this case former Chief Justice William Howard Taft, who was also the 27th President of the United States.

Taft High School was the fifth NISD high school, and the first outside Loop 1604. It is home to the magnet school Communications Arts High School which focuses primarily on college readiness and technology. The building was designed by Noonan & Dockery & Noonan & Rogers Architects and was built by the H.B. Zachry Company.

Taft was named a National Blue Ribbon School in 1997-98. In 2017, the school was rated "Met Standard" by the Texas Education Agency, with a 2-Star Distinction for Academic Achievements in Social Studies and Top 25 Percent Closing Performance Gaps.

Athletics

The Taft Raiders compete in the following sports:

Baseball
Basketball
Cross country
Football
Golf
Soccer
Softball
Swimming & diving
Tennis
Track
Volleyball

Marching Band
The Taft Raider Band has over 190 students from Communications Arts and Taft. The band qualified for the state marching contest in 2014. They participate in Region 29 and Area H UIL competitions.

Taft Raiders football 

In December of 2001 the Taft Raiders competed in the 2001 class 5A Division 1 State Championship game. The Taft Raiders faced the Mesquite Skeeters at Alamo Stadium in San Antonio,Texas. But the Taft Raiders would lose to the Skeeters by a final score of 14-13. And the Taft Raiders became 2001 State runner-up.
The Taft Raiders year by year results of Texas high school football are below from 1997-2022

Notable alumni

 Derek Cecil (Class of 1991) — Actor; starred in House of Cards on Netflix
 Otis McDaniel (Class of 2004) — Gold medal winning sprinter specializing in the 100 and 200 meters dashes
 Ike Ofoegbu (Class of 2004) - American-Nigerian Israeli Premier Basketball League player
 James Roday (Class of 1994) — Actor, director, screenwriter; born James David Rodriguez and most well known as one of two lead actors on the USA Network series Psych
 Haley Scarnato (Class of 2000) — Singer; placed 8th on Season 6 of American Idol

References

External links
Taft High School website
Northside Independent School District website

High schools in San Antonio
Public high schools in Bexar County, Texas
Northside Independent School District high schools
Taft
1985 establishments in Texas
Educational institutions established in 1985